Simone Colombi (born 1 July 1991) is an Italian professional footballer who plays as a goalkeeper for  club Reggina.

Club career

Atalanta 
Born in Seriate, the Province of Bergamo, Colombi started his career with hometown club Atalanta Bergamo. He was awarded number 91 shirt in 2008–09 season, as third keeper behind Ferdinando Coppola and Andrea Consigli.

In June 2009, he left for Lega Pro Prima Divisione club Pergocrema. He was the first choice keeper of Pergocrema until the arrival of Enrico Rossi in February. He regained his place in starting 11 in the return leg of relegation tie-breaker, which the team 1–1 draw with Pro Patria and 3–3 tie in aggregate and won the play-out by more away goal.

In August 2010, he left for fellow Lega Pro club Alessandria via Atalanta, which he was the understudy of Andrea Servili. He also signed a new 3-year contract with Atalanta on 3 August.

In January 2011 he was transferred on loan to Lega Pro Prima Divione club Juve Stabia. He played as a regular since his arrival, helping the team to gain the promotion in Serie B after the play-offs campaign. As a result, the loan is confirmed for the 2011–12 season. On 31 August 2011, he made his debut in Serie B with Juve Stabia in the home match lost 2–1 against Verona. Afterward, he had spells on loan at several Serie B teams including Modena, Padova and Carpi.

Cagliari
On 2 July 2014, Serie A side Cagliari acquired Colombi outright from Atalanta, for €1.4 million fee. In the summer of 2015 goes on loan to Palermo.

Carpi
On 2 July 2016, Serie B side Carpi have reached an agreement with Cagliari for the loan of Colombi for one season. On 10 June 2017 Carpi signed him outright.

Parma
On 11 July 2019, Seria A side Parma signed Colombi to a three-year contract.

Reggina
On 19 July 2022, Colombia moved to Reggina on a three-year deal.

International career
U16–17
Colombi made his U16 debut at U16 international Val-de-Marne tournament. He played once in U17 Euro qualification, and the two other matches as Filippo Perucchini's backup. The 2 goalkeepers also called up to 2008 Minsk U17 International Tournament to prepare for the elite round. He received a call-up to the elite round qualification. However, Colombi was dropped form the final squad; Perucchini and Daniele Giordano were the starting and reserve keeper respectively.

U19
Colombi then trained with the U19 team (born 1990 team) to compete a place in the keeper role for 2009 UEFA European Under-19 Football Championship qualification.
However, Perucchini won the place as the backup keeper. After the U19 team eliminated early, all born 1990 member were graduated and the season for players born 1991 or after came an early start in December 2008, which Colombi started the match that 3–1 won Romania. He was replaced by Tommaso Scuffia at the half time. He started the next match in March against Norway and Ukraine in April (both replaced by Luigi Sepe as second half) However, he also missed the match in January 2009 and in April (both U18 team for born 1991 or after). He returned to the team in September, started the match against Denmark (replaced by Sepe at 2nd half) and against the Netherlands in October. He started 2 out of 3 matches in 2010 UEFA European Under-19 Football Championship qualification ahead Sepe (which also played 1 match). Colombi remained as the starting keeper in the 3 friendlies before the elite round, ahead his backup Valerio Frasca, Alessandro Iacobucci and Mattia Perin.

Colombi played all 6 matches in elite qualification and the final tournament ahead Perin. The Azzurrini finished as the bottom of Group B (equal 7th).
U20
In September 2010, he was called to Italy national under-21 football team, as no.3 keeper behind Vito Mannone and Mattia Perin for the last two qualification matches.

In November 2010, he made his debut on Italy U-20, against Germany He substituted Marco Silvestri in the first half of the match.
U21
He made his debut with the Italy U-21 on 25 April 2012, in a friendly match against Scotland. Colombi was the backup of Francesco Bardi in 2013 UEFA European Under-21 Football Championship.

References

External links
 FIGC 
 Football.it Profile 
 Profile and interview
 

1991 births
Living people
People from Seriate
Footballers from Lombardy
Italian footballers
Atalanta B.C. players
U.S. Pergolettese 1932 players
U.S. Alessandria Calcio 1912 players
S.S. Juve Stabia players
Modena F.C. players
Calcio Padova players
A.C. Carpi players
Cagliari Calcio players
Palermo F.C. players
Parma Calcio 1913 players
Reggina 1914 players
Serie A players
Serie B players
Serie C players
Association football goalkeepers
Italy youth international footballers
Italy under-21 international footballers
Sportspeople from the Province of Bergamo